Moleli High School, is a co-education high school located in Mashonaland West Province, Makwiro, Chegutu District, Msengezi area near the town of Norton in the Zvimba area, 80 kilometres southwest of the Zimbabwean capital Harare. It offers O' and A' levels in boarding facilities. It was established in 1962 by Ronald E. Sellers of the Methodist Church in Zimbabwe and named after the late Methodist Rev. Modumedi Moleli and is a Methodist mission school. Moleli has a student population of about 620 pupils, and is considered one of Zimbabwe's top performing high schools. It is a sister school to Sandringham High School which they share sibling rivalry.

The school moto "Tsvakai Chokwadi Kuyamura Vamwe" is Shona meaning "seek the truth to help others". The school has been known for the Chivero Boat disaster in which 22 form 1 students were killed when their boat capsized at Lake Chivero. The school also made headlines when a mysterious hysteria hit some of the female students. In addition to academic learning, students participate in sports (including soccer, volleyball, basketball, table tennis), chess and debating. In the seventies, it was one of the only three African schools which played softball together with St. Ignatius and Kutama College.

Like most high schools in Zimbabwe, which follow the traditional British school system, students at Moleli are divided into four houses each having its own color: Mamukwa (blue), Sellers (green), Rusike (red), and White (yellow).

Notable alumni 

 Tony Gara, MP and mayor of Harare

 Gershom Pasi, Former Zimbabwe Revenue Authority (Zimra) Commissioner-General

 Bukhosi Mhlanga, Radio Presenter and Former Chief Executive Officer Of Free Hosting Africa 

 Rev Togarepi Tapera Chivaviro Student 1988-1991,Multi Award Winning musician and Author in Zimbabwe Composer and singer of one of the biggest hits in Zimbabwe EBENEZER TIRI MUNYASHA

References

Educational institutions established in 1962
High schools in Zimbabwe
Education in Mashonaland West Province
Buildings and structures in Mashonaland West Province
1962 establishments in Southern Rhodesia